Arthur Copeland Goodyer (1854 – 8 January 1932) was an English international footballer, who played as a winger.

Career
Born in Stamford, Goodyer played for Nottingham Forest from February 1876 to March 1880. He earned one cap for England on 5 April 1879 in a friendly against Scotland. England won the game 5–4.

In 1883, he married Elizabeth Angrave and in 1888 they emigrated to the US. He remained there until his death in 1932 as the result of a car accident.

References

1853 births
1932 deaths
English footballers
England international footballers
Nottingham Forest F.C. players
English Football League players
Association football midfielders